El Porteñazo (2 June 1962 – 6 June 1962) was a short-lived communist  military rebellion against the government of Rómulo Betancourt in Venezuela, in which rebels attempted to take over the city of Puerto Cabello ( from the capital). The rebellion was on a substantially larger scale than that of El Carupanazo a month earlier.

On 2 June 1962, units led by navy Captains Manuel Ponte Rodríguez, Pedro Medina Silva and Víctor Hugo Morales went into rebellion. The 55th National Guard Detachment declined to participate. The rebellion was crushed by 3 June, leaving more than 400 dead and 700 injured, and by 6 June the rebels' stronghold of Solano Castle had fallen.

A photograph of chaplain Luis María Padilla holding a wounded soldier during the rebellion won the 1963 Pulitzer Prize for Photography and 1962 World Press Photo of the Year for Héctor Rondón of La República.

Testimonies 

Different stories retelling the event mourned Venezuela, taking the rebellion as an unjust and unnecessary act of war. Many reconciled what had happened according to their personal and political affiliations.

Alí Brett wrote, according to his investigation:

He concludes his investigation by saying:

See also
 Second Presidency of Rómulo Betancourt#Internal unrest
El Barcelonazo
El Carupanazo

References

Further reading
  Alí Brett Martínez (1973), El Porteñazo: historia de una rebelión, Ediciones Adaro
  Últimas Noticias, 5 June 2012, Del archivo de la Cadena Capriles: El Porteñazo - gallery of 24 photographs, including Últimas Noticias' front page of 4 June 1962, with the award-winning photo by Hector Rondón.

1962 in Venezuela
Conflicts in 1962
Rebellions in Venezuela
June 1962 events in South America
Puerto Cabello
Rómulo Betancourt